The Big Sky Conference women's basketball tournament is held at the end of each women's college basketball regular season. The tournament was first conducted by the Big Sky Conference at the end of the 1988–89 season, the first in which the conference sponsored women's sports. The Big Sky includes in its history the preceding six years of the Mountain West Athletic Conference, a women's athletic league consisting mostly of Big Sky members that operated from 1982 to 1988, so the inaugural tournament was in March 1983. (The MWAC of the 1980s is not affiliated with the current Mountain West Conference (MWC), launched in 1999). The tournament winner receives the Big Sky's automatic bid into the NCAA tournament.

Prior to the 1982–83 season, Big Sky members with women's basketball programs housed them in several different conferences. The formation of the MWAC brought the women's sports programs of all Big Sky members under a single umbrella, and the Big Sky ultimately absorbed the MWAC in 1988, incorporating all MWAC statistics and records as its own. From the tournament's inception through the 2015 edition, each matchup was contested on the home court of the higher seed, a practice also used by the Big Sky men's tournament. The 2016 men's and women's tournaments were the first to be held at a predetermined neutral site, with both held at the Reno Events Center in Reno, Nevada. On September 18, 2017, the Big Sky Conference announced that its men's and women's basketball tournaments would move to CenturyLink Arena for three years, starting in 2019.

Starting in 1986, an MVP was selected at the conclusion of the championship game.  In 1989 (the first under the Big Sky name), the conference added all-conference team honors, in addition to the MVP.

The dominant program has been Montana, with 21 titles through 2021; next is Idaho State with four.

Results

Champions

 Boise State, Nevada, and Southern Utah never won the tournament as Big Sky members.
 Schools highlighted in pink are former members of the Big Sky

See also
Big Sky Conference men's basketball tournament

References

External links